Becker Entertainment is an Australian production company now owned by Daniel Becker and RJ Brent. This entity is not associated with R. A. Becker PTY LTD, later renamed Becker Group, which was founded in 1965 by Russell Becker.

History
Founded in 1965 by Russell Becker, one of the pioneers of commercial television in Australia. Becker was Australia's first independent distributor of television programs. It went on to become a major producer of Australian versions of numerous American game shows.

The company expanded into theatrical film distribution in the early '90s as REP (standing for Richard Entertainment Partners after Russell Becker's son Richard and his two friends Richard Sheffield and Richard Guardian who collaborated with him on the move into film. Richard Sheffield ran REP as a Becker employee until he left to establish the Australian office of PolyGram Pictures).

The Australian box office success of Four Weddings and a Funeral fueled the listing of Becker Entertainment Limited on the Australian Stock Exchange in 1995, with Richard Becker as Managing Director and Russell as Chairman. Subsequently, Becker Entertainment purchased the Dendy Cinema chain and became Australia's largest exhibitor of art house or limited release theatrical films.

The value of the Dendy brand, which Becker enhanced with new cinema construction, lead to the renaming of the theatrical distribution department to Dendy Distribution.

Prior to the sale of Becker Entertainment to Prime Television in 2007, these two divisions were sold to Mel Gibson and Bruce Davey's Icon Productions.

After stepping down from Becker Entertainment in 2007, Richard Becker went on to establish a new company, Becker Film Group in 2008

With the remaining assets owned by Prime Television Limited, the company was eventually delisted from the Australian Stock Exchange, and remaining rights absorbed into Prime Television Limited. Prime went on to rename the company WASTAR ENTERTAINMENT PTY LTD  ACN 073 853 371  and would eventually deregister the company 9 June 2013.

New Beginning

On 22 September 2016, Daniel Becker and RJ Brent successfully lobbied ASIC to register a new trading entity of Becker Entertainment Pty Ltd  ACN 614 954 157

This company was established as a Film and TV Production Company, and started focusing on projects in 2017 with My Day Job and Ravenswood.

See also

Prime Television Limited
List of companies of Australia
List of film production companies
List of television production companies

References

External links
 Becker Entertainment

Television production companies of Australia
Prime Media Group
Seven Network
Entertainment companies established in 1965
1965 establishments in Australia